A tchotchke is a small bric-à-brac or miscellaneous item. The word has long been used by Jewish-Americans and in the regional speech of New York City and elsewhere. It is borrowed from Yiddish and is ultimately Slavic in origin.

The word may also refer to free promotional items dispensed at trade shows, conventions, and similar commercial events. They can also be sold as cheap souvenirs in tourist areas, which are sometimes called "tchotchke shops".

Spelling  

A wide variety of spellings exist for the English usage of the term, e.g., tshotshke, tshatshke, tchachke, tchotchka, tchatchka, chachke, tsotchke, chotski, or chochke; the standard Yiddish transliteration is tsatske or tshatshke. In YIVO standard orthography, it is spelled טשאַטשקע. A Hebrew variant is צ׳אצ׳קע, using צ (tsade) with a geresh to represent the sound .

Alternative meanings and context  

Depending on the context, the term has a connotation of worthlessness or disposability as well as tackiness.

A common confusion is between the terms tchotchke and tsatske or rather tsatskele, with the diminutive ending -le. Both terms have the same Slavic root, but the tch- version stems from Russian, while the ts- originates in Polish. Tchotchke usually references trinkets, while tsatskele is more likely to mean a young girl or woman who uses her charms to reach her goals. Being Yiddish, the meaning can change by the use of gestures and a change in tone, so that tsatskele can become the favorite child.

Leo Rosten, author of The Joys of Yiddish, combines the two main meanings and gives an alternative sense of tchotchke as meaning a young girl, a "pretty young thing". Less flatteringly, the term could be construed as a more dismissive synonym for "bimbo", or "slut".

Etymology  

The word tchotchke derives from a Slavic word for "trinket" (plural ;  ;), adapted to Yiddish singular  .

References

External links  

 Tchotchke (n.) on Online Etymology Dictionary
 Tchotchke etymology on World Wide Words

Yiddish words and phrases
Slang terms for women
Memorabilia